Mark Birch may refer to:
Mark Birch (musician), English rock guitarist
Mark Birch (footballer) (born 1977), English footballer
Mark Birch (jockey) (1949–2016), British jockey